Kern is a surname. Notable people with the surname include:

 Adele Kern (1901–1980), German soprano opera and operetta singer
 Anna Petrovna Kern (1800–1873), Pushkin's mistress
 András Kern (born 1948), Hungarian actor
 Brad Kern, American television producer
 Brett Kern, American football punter
 Christian Kern, Austrian politician
 David J. Kern, American naval officer
 Dorothee Kern (born 1966), German-American biochemist
 Doug Kern (born 1963), American sailor
 Ericca Kern (born 1965), American bodybuilder
 Edward Kern (1822–1863), American cartographer and artist
 Jamie Kern (born 1977), American television personality
 Hal C. Kern (1894–1985), American film editor
 Hermann Armin von Kern (1838–1912), Austrian painter
 Jerome Kern (1885–1945), American composer
 Jim Kern (born 1949), American baseball player
 Joey Kern (born 1976), American actor
 Johan Hendrik Caspar Kern (1833–1917), aka H. Kern, Dutch linguist and Anglo-Indian educator
 Johannes Hendrikus Kern (1903–1974), Dutch botanist
 John W. Kern (1849–1917), American politician
 Karl-Hans Kern (1932–2014), German politician
 Kevin Kern (born 1958), American musician
 Marc Kern (ice hockey) (born 1989), Swiss ice hockey player
 Mitch Kern (born 1965), American art photographer
 Nathaniel Kern, American oil industry consultant
 Olga Kern (born 1975), Russian classical pianist
 Otto Kern (1863–1942), German linguist
 Patricia Kern (1927–2015), British mezzo-soprano and voice teacher
 Paul J. Kern (born 1945), American army officer and businessman
 Peter E. Kern (1860–1937), American entrepreneur 
 Ralph Kern (born 1967), German artistic gymnast
 Richard Kern (born 1954), American photographer and filmmaker
 Robert Henry Kern, American engineer and entrepreneur
 Ruth Kern (1914–2002), American lawyer
 Robert J. Kern (1885–1972), American film editor
 Sally Kern (born 1946), Oklahoma state legislator
 Sean Kern (born 1978), American water polo player
 Werner Kern (football manager) (born 1946), German football coach

See also
Kerns (surname)

German-language surnames